Coming Out of the Ice is a 1982 American made-for-television biographical film of Victor Herman. It is based upon Herman's 1979 autobiography of the same name.

Cast
John Savage
Willie Nelson

See also
 The Forsaken: An American Tragedy in Stalin’s Russia

References

External links
Coming Out of the Ice at IMDb
Coming Out of the Ice at BFI
Coming Out of the Ice at TCMDB
Review at Washington Post

1982 television films
1982 films
1980s biographical films
American biographical films
CBS network films
Films directed by Waris Hussein
Films scored by Maurice Jarre
1980s American films